On November 11, 2018, a mass shooting occurred in Globe, Arizona, when 22-year-old Sterling Hunt opened fire on a group of people outside a bar on North Broad Street. Three people were killed in the gunfire, while another was wounded. Hunt was arrested later that night, pleaded guilty to three counts of murder, and sentenced to three consecutive life sentences on February 12, 2021.

Shooting 
On November 11, 2018, 22-year-old Sterling Randall Hunt entered the Jammerz Bar on North Broad Street. Hunt was seen playing pool with a group of people prior to the shooting. Shortly before 10:30 p.m., a few people from the group stepped away to smoke outside, with Hunt following close behind. Outside, he brandished a handgun and opened fire on the group. Immediately, he fatally shot two people; 44-year-old Cristi Licano, and 22-year-old Daniel Albo. Another two he shot, 22-year-old Ashley Sanchez, who was Albo's cousin, and 20-year-old Charlene Peak, were shot and wounded. A fifth person, Scott Mills, was shot at by Hunt, but he managed to take cover and as a result, none of the bullets struck him. After the shooting, Hunt fled the bar, and was captured an hour later on the San Carlos Apache Indian Reservation. Both Sanchez and Peak were airlifted to a Phoenix hospital. Sanchez spent seven days in the hospital before she died from her injuries. Peak made a full recovery.

Victims

Killed 
Daniel Albo, 22
Cristi Licano, 44
Ashley Sanchez, 22

Injured 
Charlene Peak, 20

Source:

Legal proceedings 
Hunt was charged with three counts of first-degree murder and two counts of attempted murder. Authorities confirmed that the shooting was not racially motivated and was simply a random act of violence. On November 19, Hunt was moved to the Pinal County jail. Seven days after the shooting, Jammerz Bar had its liquor license suspended by the Arizona Department of Liquor Licenses and Control.

A year after the shooting, the city dedicated a bench to the three victims killed. In February 2021, prosecutors offered a plea deal to Hunt which would let him plead guilty to all charges to avoid the death penalty. Family members of the victims and survivors of the shooting all agreed to the proposal. Hunt accepted the plea, and on February 12, Hunt was sentenced to three consecutive life sentences without the possibility of parole.

See also 
 Shooting of Jemel Roberson (a shooting that occurred on the same day as the Globe shooting)

References 

2018 mass shootings in the United States
2018 in Arizona
Mass shootings in Arizona
2018 murders in the United States
Attacks on buildings and structures in the United States
Mass shootings in the United States
Attacks on buildings and structures in 2018
November 2018 crimes in the United States
Murder in Arizona
Deaths by firearm in Arizona
Attacks on bars
History of Gila County, Arizona